Sir David de Graham of Dundaff was a 13th-century Scottish noble.

David was the son of Patrick de Graham. He served Patrick, Earl of Dunbar, and was the deputy justiciar of Lothian in 1248. He was Sheriff of Berwick by 1264. He died c.1272.

Family and issue
He married Agnes Noble and is known to have had the following issue:
Patrick, (d. 1296), married Annabella, widow of John of Restalrig, the daughter of Robert, Earl of Strathearn; had issue. 
John, (d. 1298); had issue.
David of Lovat, (d.c.1297), married Mary Bisset, the co-heiress of John Bisset, Lord of Lovat; had issue.

Citations

References
Debrett, John, "Debrett's Peerage, Baronetage, Knightage, and Companionage, Volume 2"; Kelly's Directories, 1822.

13th-century Scottish people
Medieval Scottish knights
Scottish people of the Wars of Scottish Independence
David